Strathfield is an electoral district of the Legislative Assembly in the Australian state of New South Wales. Since a by-election in 2022, it has been represented by  Jason Yat-Sen Li  of the Labor Party . It was first created in 1988 and derives its name from the suburb of the same name.

Strathfield is an urban electorate, covering 19 km² and taking in the suburbs of Belfield, Burwood Heights, Burwood, Croydon, Croydon Park, Enfield, Flemington, Homebush West, Strathfield, Strathfield South and parts of Ashbury, Ashfield, Campsie and Homebush.

History

Strathfield was created in 1988. While traditionally a marginal electorate, Strathfield tended to favour the Liberal Party in its earlier years. It was first won by Liberal Paul Zammit, who later went on to have a short-lived career as a Liberal member of the federal House of Representatives. Zammit later contested the federal seat as an independent on the issue of airports and air traffic over the area. Zammit was succeeded by Liberal Bruce MacCarthy, who was defeated after one term. His successor, Paul Whelan, was a prominent sitting minister in the Carr government who had shifted to Strathfield from the abolished seat of Ashfield, and subsequently served as Police Minister while the member for Strathfield. The seat has tended to lean towards  ever since, with Whelan being succeeded by Virginia Judge. Judge lost the seat in 2011 to Liberal candidate Charles Casuscelli, but he was in turn defeated by Labor's Jodi McKay in 2015.

Members for Strathfield

Election results

References

Strathfield
Constituencies established in 1988
1988 establishments in Australia